Marcus Johnson (born 1971) is an American jazz musician, producer, and entrepreneur. He is the director of For the Love Of Brands, a company that houses both a music and a wine label.  He is the CEO and President of Marimelj Entertainment Group, Three Keys Music, and Three Keys Publishing.  He is also the CEO and founder of both FLO Brands, LLC and FLO Wines, LLC.

Early life 
Marcus Johnson was born in Columbus, Ohio. At age ten, he established a neighborhood lawn care service. He and his family moved to Washington, D.C. when he was 12 years old. As a teenager, he started an auto-detailing company and played in a jazz band at Montgomery Blair High School. Subsequently, Marcus attended the University of Miami to study music production. Johnson earned a bachelor of arts degree in music at Howard University, where he was a member of Alpha Phi Alpha fraternity. At Georgetown University, he earned both  M.B.A. and J.D. degrees.

Marcus grew up listening to a wide variety of music, but found his calling in jazz, where he incorporates the rhythms of rap with R&B.  His interest in jazz became apparent when he began playing piano at age 13. Marcus's step-father purchased his first keyboard after winning Maryland's Pick 3 Lottery. Marcus was inspired to learn traditional and contemporary jazz music by observing other musicians. (Joe Sample and Thelonious Monk are two names he frequently cites).

Musical career

Musician

When studying at Georgetown University, Johnson independently released his first jazz album, Lessons in Love, which sold more than 40,000 units.  In 1997, he released his second jazz album, Inter Alia. These two independent CDs topped the bestseller charts at Tower Records stores in the Washington, D.C. area.  His growing reputation attracted the attention of N2K Encoded Music, now known as N-Coded Music, which signed him and released Chocolate City Groovin'''.

 Music publishing 
Also while studying at Georgetown, Johnson established Marimelj Entertainment Group, Inc., a production company and music publishing firm which churns out a mixture of contemporary jazz, alternative, and R&B to create what the company calls “the Urban Groove.” Johnson's success with his albums caught the attention of Black Entertainment Television (BET) founder and businessman Robert L. Johnson, who invested in Marimelj.  Under their partnership, Marimelj's label, Three Keys Music, established its own full service recording studio, Studio 8121; and two music publishing companies, Marimelj Music Publishing and Three Keys Music Publishing.

Three Keys is an independent music publishing company Johnson created. It was started as a local record label. The record label also features and produced music for national jazz artists: Michael Lington, Jaared Arosemena, Bobby Lyle, Nick Colionne, R&B singer, Alyson Williams, neo-soul songstress, Zahzarah; and smooth jazz Saxophonists Phillip Martin and Brian Lenair. 

To date, Marcus has released more than fifteen Billboard charted CDs, and has the distinction of having his groundbreaking 2008 Billboard Top 20 Contemporary Jazz FLO (For the Love Of) Anthology, which consisted of three distinct CDs -- FLO Chill, FLO Romance and FLO Standards - all chart Top 10 on Billboard Contemporary Jazz Charts simultaneously.

Personal life
Johnson resides in Maryland. He has a daughter.

Awards
Johnson was nominated for an NAACP Image Award in 2010.

He was also nominated for Best Urban Contemporary Instrumentalist in the Washington Area Music Association's WAMMIES in 2013.

He was awarded the Samuel A. Halsey Award from his alma mater, Georgetown University, on January 17, 2015.

 Discography 
 Lessons in Love (1997) 
 Inter Alia (1997; re-released in 2000)
 Chocolate City Groovin (1998) 
 Urban Groove (2000) 
 Comin' Back Around (2001)
 In Person - Live at Blues Alley (2002)
 Just Doing What I Do (2004)
 Smooth Jazz Christmas (2005) 
 Phoenix (2007) 
 In Concert for a Cause (2008) 
 Flo: Chill (2008)
 Flo: Romance (2008) 
 Flo: Standards (2008) 
 Poetically Justified (2009)
 This Is How I Rock (2010) 
 Flo Chill, Vol. 2: Juris (2010) 
 Flo (For The Love Of) Holiday'' (2011)

References 

American chief executives of food industry companies
American jazz musicians
American lawyers
Georgetown University alumni
Howard University alumni
Living people
1971 births